Sedan Castle is a castle situated in Sedan, France, near the river Meuse.

History 
Around 1424, Eberhard II von der Mark built a manor with two towers around a church over a period of six years. When Eberhard died in 1440, his son Jean de la Marck began reinforcing the fortress, but it was Robert II de la Marck, the grandson of Jean, who finished the most important work. In 1530, the fortifications of the manor were modernised by the construction of a circular boulevard and terraces with cannons, thickening the  curtain wall by an additional . The bastions were added during the course of the next century, but some of them were eventually dynamited at the end of the 19th century. In 1699, the principality having been absorbed into France in 1642 (see the Battle of Marfée, during the Thirty Years' War), and the castle having been transformed into a garrison, Vauban built the door of the Princes that was adapted to the progress of artillery. In 1822, the Church of Saint-Martin was demolished and replaced with a store for cannonballs.

Turenne was born in the Château de Sedan in 1611.

Franco-Prussian War 
On September 1, 1870 during the Franco-Prussian War, the Army of Chalons was defeated at the Battle of Sedan. Napoleon III surrendered the following day in the small neighboring city of Donchery.

World Wars I and II 
The castle was used as a military hospital by the German army in World War I. Sedan was also the site of a French loss to the Germans in World War II in the Battle of Sedan (1940).

Current use 

The castle was given by the French Army to the city of Sedan in 1962. Today the castle contains a hotel and a museum showing the lives of inhabitants throughout its history and the Franco-Prussian War.

See also 
 List of castles in France
Principality of Sedan

References

External links 

 Fortifications of Sedan 
  The Château de Sedan in the Bouillon et Sedan site
 

Monuments historiques of Grand Est
Castles in the Ardennes (France)
Châteaux in Ardennes (department)
Historic house museums in Grand Est
Museums in Ardennes (department)
Sedan, Ardennes